Cort is the surname of several people:
 Cornelis Cort (1536–1578), Dutch engraver
 Henry Cort (1740–1800), English ironmaster
 Frans de Cort (1834–1878), Flemish writer
 Hendrik Frans de Cort (1742-1810), Flemish landscape painter
 John Cort (impresario) (1861–1929), American impresario
 John Cyrus Cort (1913–2006), American Christian socialist writer and activist
 John E. Cort (born 1953), American indologist and writer on Jainism
 Bud Cort (born 1948), American actor
 Barry Cort (born 1956), American baseball player
 Carl Cort (born 1977), English footballer
 Leon Cort (born 1979), English footballer
 Liam Cort (born 1989), English basketball player

Cort can also refer to:
 CORT (Cortistatin), human gene
 Cortisol, hormone commonly abbreviated as cort
 Cortinarius, a genus of mushrooms 
 Cort Guitars, guitar manufacturer based in South Korea
 Cort v. Ash, 1975 case in the United States Supreme Court 
 Cort, a fictional character in the Stephen King Universe.